Laciadae or Lakiadai was a deme of ancient Attica on the Sacred Way between Sciron and the Cephissus, and near the sacred fig-tree. It is celebrated as the deme to which the family of Miltiades and Cimon belonged.

References

Populated places in ancient Attica
Former populated places in Greece
Demoi